John Hartnett (born 1960 in Midleton, County Cork) is a former Irish sportsperson. He played hurling with his local club Midleton and was a member of the Cork senior inter-county team from 1983 until 1984. He contributed to Cork's victory in the Centenary Cup in 1984.

References

1957 births
Living people
Midleton hurlers
Cork inter-county hurlers